The Qassab (from the Arabic word  (Qasaab- butcher), are members of a north Indian community or biradari. Occasionally most Quresh caste members are referred to as the Qassab.
At present, Qassab who are engaged in meat cutting and selling business are referred to as Qureshi.

History and origin
The qasabs (quraishi) were converts from the lower and untouchable castes of Hinduism. 
Even in South Asian Muslim society, they are counted as arjals or untouchables due to their handling of meat and blood products.

The community is entirely Sunni, and in North India speaks Urdu.

For their participation in Indian Rebellion of 1857, fine Rs. 63,000 was imposed on the people of Rohtak who were mostly Ranghars, Shaikhs and Muslim Qassab.

Present circumstances

In North India
The community remains associated with the slaughtering of animals. Apart from selling meats, they are also involved in the sale and purchase of animals, as well as trading in hides. The Chikwa of Awadh are also involved in the selling of hides. In terms of distribution, they are found throughout Uttar Pradesh and Bihar. They are strictly endogamous, which marriages preferred within a small kinship circle. Most towns include distinct quarters where the community lives, such as Kanpur, Allahabad, Banaras, Fatehpur, Qureshnagar in Delhi.

The Anjuman Quresh is an India-wide association, and is the oldest Muslim organization. The community belong to both the Sunni and Shia sects of Islam, but the majority are Sunnis. The Chikwa speak Awadhi, while the Qureshi Qassab speak Urdu.

In Rajasthan, the Qassab are found in the districts of Ajmer, Jaipur, Nagaur, Jodhpur and Pali. The Qassab speak Mewari among themselves, and Hindi with outsiders. They have two sub-divisions, the Barakasab, who slaughter ox, bulls and buffaloes, and Chhotakasab, who slaughter goats. The Qassab have local caste associations, known as jamats, in each of their settlements, which deal with disputes within the community.

In Bihar, the Qassab are a class of Muslim butchers, and are generally known as Qureshis. They are found throughout Bihar, and are one of the few Bihari Muslim communities that speaks Urdu. The Qassab consist of two sub-groups, the Bara Karbar, who were involved in the slaughtering of ox, bulls and buffaloes, and Chota Karbar, who slaughtered goats. Closely related to the Qassab are the Chik, a caste also associated with the slaughtering of goats. The Anjuman Quresh has a Bihar branch, which acts as a welfare association. They are entirely Sunni Muslims, and are fairly orthodox. They were one of the earliest groups to shift towards the Deobandi sect.

In Maharashtra

The Qassab of Maharashtra are said to have come over from Hyderabad to Amravati, and were soldiers in the army of the Nizam of Hyderabad, and still speak the Dakhani dialect of Urdu. They were initially divided into two groups, the Gai Qassab (ox, bulls and buffaloes butchers) and Bakar Qassab (mutton butchers). The community is further divided into three groups, the Chaudhary, the Saudagor and Sikku. They speak the Dakhani dialect of Urdu among themselves, and Marathi with outsiders. The Qassab are Sunni, and strictly endogamous. They practice both cross cousin and parallel cousin marriages. In Maharashtra, the community are found in the cities of Amravati, Buldhana, Akola, Chandrapur, Nagpur, Pune, Bhiwandi and Mumbai.

In Pakistan
In Pakistan, the Qassab are found in the province of Punjab. They have Eight major divisions, Arbi, Bhatti, Khokhar, Goraha and Suhal. In addition to butchering, the Qassab of Punjab have been involved with cotton cleaning. The Penja community is of Qaasab extraction.

Pakistan is also home to communities, which originate from Delhi and Haryana. They are an Urdu-speaking community found mainly in the cities of Karachi, Lahore, Multan and Faisalabad, Dera Ghazi Khan, Muzaffar Garh, Vehari Like their Indian counterparts, the Qureshi Qassab also have a caste association or anjuman. They are also called Sheikh Qureshi.

In Jammu and Kashmir
The Qassab of the Kashmir valley are known as the Pujj. 

They assumed this high-sounding surname to escape the social stigma associated with the butchery profession in traditional Hindu society. Presently many butchers use the surname Pujj but only some of them are in the butchery profession. Like other Qassab groups, many are also involved in the buying and selling of hides, which has made the Pujj a wealthy community. The traditional caste council has been replaced by the Pujj association.

The All India Jamiatul Quresh

Like many Muslim communities in India, the Qassab have set up the All India Jamiatil Quresh, which was established in Meerut in 1927. The Jamiat was set up by Bhaiyya Rasheeduddin Ahmed, MLC,  Landlord, a wealthy merchant and philanthropist. He has established under 3700 schools . It has a federal structure, with each state having its own chapter. Its headquarters are in Kothi Khan Bahadur, Meerut Uttar Pradesh.  Any male member of the community can take up membership. As a caste association, the Jamait campaigns on behalf of the community as well as acting as a welfare organization, and running schools and hospitals.

Bawarchi of Uttar Pradesh

The Bawarchi are a sub-group within the Qassab, and get their name from the Urdu word bawarchi, which means "a cook". A split from the wider Qassab community is said to have taken place when a group of Lucknow Qassab changed their occupation from butchering to cooking. There is no intermarriage now between the Bawarchi and neighbouring Qassab communities. They are still found mainly in the city of Lucknow, in the localities of Sadar, Husainganj, Fatehganj and Chowk.  The Bawarchi prefer to be known as Qureshi or Ahl-e-Quresh.

The Bawarchi speak Urdu and belong to the Sunni sect.  They are a community of professional cooks, who historically were employed by wealthy Awadh taluqdars. With the disappearance of their traditional patrons at the time of the independence of India, the community are now employed in restaurants and hotels, and specialise in Awadhi cuisine.

The Bawarchi and Rakabdars of Awadh gave birth to the dum style of cooking or the art of cooking over a slow fire, which has become synonymous with Lucknow today. Their spread would consist of elaborate dishes like kebabs, kormas, biryani, kaliya, nahari-kulchas, zarda, sheermal, roomali rotis and warqi parathas. The richness of Awadh cuisine lies not only in the variety of cuisine but also in the ingredients used like mutton, paneer, and rich spices including cardamom and saffron.

Like other Muslim artisans, many have seen a decline in their traditional occupation, and are now petty businessmen. The Bawarchi have no formal caste association, but each of their settlements contains a panchayat, an informal caste association.  Each settlement panchayat is headed by a chaudhary, a post which was traditionally heredity. The panchayat deals with intra community disputes and punishes any social transgressions. Some Bawarchi are also involved with the Anjuman Quraish.

Bawarchi of Gujarat
In Gujarat, the Bawarchi are said to have been soldiers in the army of the Mughal Emperor Babar, and settled in Gujarat some five centuries ago. Once in Gujarat, these soldiers changed their occupation and took up cooking, hence becoming known as Bawarchi. The Bawarchi are now found in the cities of Ahmadabad, Surat, and Baroda, and a few villages in Kheda District. They speak a dialect which is a mixture of Gujarati and Urdu.

Like most Gujarati Muslims, the Bawarchi have a caste association, the Ahmedabad Bawarchi Jamat. The jamat acts as both a community welfare association as well as an instrument of social control. Like other Qassab sub-groups, the Gujarat Bawarchi are strictly endogamous. Most prefer marrying close kin, and practice both parallel cousin and cross cousin marriages. The Bawarchi are entirely Sunni, but also incorporate some folk beliefs.

Like most Muslim artisan castes, the Bawarchi have seen a decline in their traditional occupation, which involved being employed as cooks in wealthier Muslim families. Other were owners of caravanserais. Very few Bawarchis have taken up higher education, as the community is extremely economically marginalized. Many are now employed as daily wage labourers.

Notable Qureshi People 
 Huma Qureshi, Bollywood Actress
Saqib Saleem Qureshi, Bollywood Actor 
Mohammad Shafi Qureshi, Former Union Deputy Minister of Railway and Governor of MP, UP & Bihar 
Rahat Indori, Indian Urdu Poet & Bollywood Lyricist

S M Qureshi, Pakistani Academic  
Yaqub Qureishi, Indian Politician  
S. Y. Quraishi, Former Chief Election Commissioner of India
Shah Mahmood Qureshi, Pakistani Politician   
Ahsaan Qureshi, Indian Stand-up Comedian
Aziz Qureshi ,15th Governor of Mizoram,India
Dulari Qureshi, Indian Art Historian
Fazal Qureshi, Indian Tabla Player  
Zakir Hussain, Indian Tabla Player  
Hashim Qureshi, Kashmiri Separatist leader from India
Iqbal Hussain Qureshi, Pakistani Nuclear Chemist Scientist

Kamran Qureshi, British Filmmaker  
Uzair Qureshi, English Cricketer  
Yaqub Qureshi ,Indian Politician  
Shah Abdul Majid Qureshi, Bangladeshi restaurateur and social reformer

References

Social groups of Uttar Pradesh
Indian castes
Muslim communities of India
Shaikh clans
Social groups of Pakistan
Punjabi tribes
Social groups of Bihar
Social groups of Rajasthan
Social groups of Jammu and Kashmir
Social groups of Maharashtra
Muslim communities of Maharashtra
Muslim communities of Uttar Pradesh
Muslim communities of Bihar